Karl Schnabl (born March 8, 1954 in Achomitz, community Hohenthurn, Carinthia) is an Austrian former ski jumper who competed during the 1970s.

His best-known successes were at the 1976 Winter Olympics in Innsbruck, where he won a gold medal in the individual large hill event and a bronze medal in the individual normal hill event. He also won the ski jumping event at the Holmenkollen ski festival in 1976.

Schnabl also won bronze at the FIS Ski Flying World Championships in 1975. He also finished fourth in the individual large hill event at the 1978 FIS Nordic World Ski Championships in Lahti.

Since finishing medical school at Innsbruck University, he has been working as a doctor in sports medicine until he retired in 2019.

References
 
  - click Vinnere for downloadable pdf file 
 

1954 births
Austrian surgeons
Austrian male ski jumpers
Holmenkollen Ski Festival winners
Living people
Olympic ski jumpers of Austria
Olympic gold medalists for Austria
Ski jumpers at the 1976 Winter Olympics
Olympic medalists in ski jumping
Medalists at the 1976 Winter Olympics
Olympic bronze medalists for Austria